Silent Reach is a 1983 Australian mini series based on the novel by Osmar White.

References

External links
Silent Reach at IMDb

1980s Australian television miniseries
1983 Australian television series debuts
1983 Australian television series endings